Several political organisations have been called Romanian National Committee:

 Romanian National Committee (1848), made to coordinate the 1848 revolutions of Romanians in Transylvania
 Romanian National Committee (1918), with the aim of unifying Transylvania with Romania
 Romanian National Committee (1940), organization against the National Legionary State in Romania
 Romanian National Committee (1948), self-proclaimed government in exile of Romania during its communist period
 Romanian National Committee (1975), continuation attempt of the latter, which was disestablished in 1972

Romania politics-related lists
Lists of organizations based in Romania